Nobody's Baby may refer to:

 Nobody's Baby (2001 film), a comedy film
 Nobody's Baby (1937 film), an American comedy film